The Long, Long Trailer is a 1954 American Anscocolor road comedy film based on a novel of the same name written by Clinton Twiss in 1951 about a couple who buy a new travel trailer home and spend a year traveling across the United States.

The film stars Lucille Ball and Desi Arnaz. It also features Marjorie Main, Keenan Wynn, Bert Freed, Moroni Olsen, Gladys Hurlbut, Madge Blake, Howard McNear, and Walter Baldwin. The film was directed by Vincente Minnelli, working from a screenplay by Albert Hackett and Frances Goodrich.

Plot
As Nicholas Collini takes a new job as a civil engineer, his new bride Tacy comes up with an idea to buy a trailer to travel around the USA to various work projects on which Nicky is employed, as well as to save money that would otherwise be spent on a house. Tacy also hopes to haul the trailer themselves to Nicky's new place of work in Colorado, as part of their honeymoon trip to the Sierra Nevada mountains. But the honeymoon trip, as well as happenings leading up to it, rapidly becomes a series of disasters.

Shortly after arriving at the trailer show, Tacy and Nicky come across a large trailer home, which Tacy instantly falls in love with. To tow the trailer, the Collinis end up buying a new car and trailer hitch, and the money spent starts to mount up.

Early in the trip, after being swamped by friendly trailer park neighbors their first night, Tacy decides to camp back in the woods the next night. But after turning on an old logging road, the trailer falls on its side into the mud during a rainstorm, which Nicky tries to level. The next day, the Collinis go to visit Tacy's relatives. But upon arriving at the home of her aunt and uncle, with other relatives and neighbors who are gathered watching, Nicky accidentally backs the trailer into their hosts' carport, partly destroying it as well as a prized rose bush. 

As Tacy and Nicky continue traveling, Tacy is determined to make their trailer into a home, collecting fruits and vegetables to can for winter, as well as rocks to decorate their front patio when they arrive at their ultimate destination in Colorado. Soon Tacy wants to learn how to drive the car, but after being constantly criticized by Nicky about her driving skills, Tacy gets out and jumps in the back, furious. After having another fight that evening over who was sleeping where for the night, they make up again.

The following afternoon, Tacy attempts to cook dinner while Nicky drives, hoping to have dinner ready once he parks the trailer at their next stop. It goes awry, as the trailer moves and rocks, causing the dinner to be ruined and Tacy getting severely bruised. Afterwards, Nicky decides to take an offer on the trailer, hoping he and Tacy can move into an actual house. But Tacy is still determined to keep the trailer, and refuses to sell it.

That evening, Nicky orders Tacy to get rid of all the rocks and canned foods she has collected before they make a cliffhanging ride on a narrow road through the mountains. But Tacy feels they are throwing away precious memories of their honeymoon, and decides to keep them hidden, so Nicky won't find them. But as Nicky and Tacy drive up and down the mountain, everything Tacy has hidden rolls around inside the trailer, causing a big mess. 

Finally, when they reach the top of the  mountain, the trailer falls over again, weighed down by all of the possessions. In a rage, Nicky takes everything Tacy has collected and throws it off the mountain. Tacy later storms off in a huff.

As their marriage deteriorates, Nicky meets up with Tacy as she prepares to sell the trailer and move back home. Nicky attempts to apologize, but doesn't know where to start and instead leaves. As Nicky starts driving off in the pouring rain, Tacy runs to catch up with him. The two finally forgive each other, and tearfully reconcile.

Cast

 Lucille Ball as Tacy Bolton-Collini
 Desi Arnaz as Nicholas 'Nicky' Collini
 Marjorie Main as Mrs. Hittaway
 Keenan Wynn as Policeman
 Gladys Hurlbut as Mrs. Bolton
 Moroni Olsen as Mr. Tewitt
 Bert Freed as Foreman
 Madge Blake as Aunt Anastacia
 Walter Baldwin as Uncle Edgar

Emory Parnell has a small, uncredited role as a policeman.

Production
The new car used to tow the trailer is a 1953 Mercury Monterey convertible with a 125 HP flathead V8 engine.

Opening scenes were shot on Metro-Goldwyn-Mayer's Stage 12, the same location at which Arnaz played his first film scene in Bataan, eleven years before.

The dangerous mountain highway featured is Whitney Portal Road, which leads up to Mount Whitney in the Sierra Nevada mountains in California. The hairpin turn offers scenic views of the Owens Valley. During the scenes of Nicky and Tacy pulling their trailer in the mountains, their 1953 Mercury Monterey convertible is replaced with a larger but similar appearing 1953 Lincoln Capri convertible. The distinct Lincoln grille is clearly evident in a shot as the car rounds a curve. The more powerful Lincoln (which is equipped with a 205 HP OHV Y-block V8 engine) was needed to pull the heavy New Moon trailer up and over the steep grades of the Sierra Nevada where the scenes were filmed. Other scenes were shot on the Pines to Palms Scenic Byway (State Route 74) in Palm Desert, California.

The residence of Tacy's aunt and uncle (where the porch and rosebush are destroyed by the trailer) is the Meet Me in St. Louis John Truett house on the MGM Backlot, next door to the Smith Family house. The house where the trailer was parked and being chaotically packed with housewares by Tacy's friends appears to be Lucy and Desi's actual home on Roxbury Drive in Beverly Hills.

The closing credits thank the National Park Service for permission to film in Yosemite National Park. There is one memorable scene where the car and trailer emerge from a tunnel to a view of Yosemite Valley, complete with a panorama of El Capitan, Half Dome, and Bridalveil Fall as the stars sing a duet. Later, there is a view of a full-flowing Yosemite Falls.

Reception
According to Turner Classic Movies' host, Robert Osborne, the studio was not sure if this film would be a success because it was thought people would not pay money to see Lucille Ball and Desi Arnaz in a movie when they could watch the couple on television for free (I Love Lucy). Arnaz made a $25,000 bet with the studio that the movie would make more money than the current highest-grossing comedy at that time (Father of the Bride, starring Spencer Tracy and Elizabeth Taylor and also directed by Vincente Minnelli). Arnaz won the bet. The film gave audiences an opportunity to see Arnaz and Ball in color when I Love Lucy was in black and white.

According to MGM records the film earned $3,978,000 in the US and Canada and $1,007,000 elsewhere, resulting in a profit of $3,550,000.

Home media
"The Long, Long Trailer" was released on VHS in 1982, and again in 1990 by MGM/UA Home Video and Turner Entertainment. It was released on DVD in 2006, this time by Warner Home Video in Region 1 coding for the U.S. and Canada. It was released as a single disc and as a part of a 3-DVD set featuring two other Ball/Arnaz movies, Forever, Darling and Too Many Girls. The film was also released in Region 4 coding for Australia.

In popular culture
The film is referenced in the They Might Be Giants song "Everything Right Is Wrong Again" which contains the lyrics "Everything right is wrong again / Just like in The Long, Long Trailer / All the dishes got broken / The car kept driving / And nobody would stop to save her".

References

External links
 
 
 
 
 
 The Long, Long Trailer at Trailerite.com
 Full-text of the Twiss novel

1954 films
1954 comedy films
1950s comedy road movies
American comedy road movies
Films based on American novels
Films shot in California
Metro-Goldwyn-Mayer films
Films directed by Vincente Minnelli
Films produced by Pandro S. Berman
Films scored by Adolph Deutsch
1950s English-language films
1950s American films